William Gray Bruce Moore (6 October 1894 – 26 September 1968) was an English footballer who played as an inside-left in the Football League for Sunderland and West Ham United.

Playing career 
Moore was born in Newcastle upon Tyne and played for Sunderland, where he partnered Henry Martin on the left, having previously played for Seaton Delaval.

Moore played for West Ham United between 1922 and 1929. He was an ever-present in the side that won promotion back to Division One in 1922–23, and played in the famous White Horse Final of 1923. He received full international recognition with his first cap for the English main team against Sweden on 24 May 1923, scoring twice in a 3–1 victory. Previously he had already played three matches for the England Amateurs against Belgium, Denmark and Sweden, all of which prior to the war, having netted four goals.

Moore stayed at West Ham to become assistant trainer after his playing career ended in 1929. He was promoted in 1932, and stayed at the club as trainer-in-chief until his retirement in 1960.

Career statistics

Goals for England
England score listed first, score column indicates score after each Moore goal.

Goals for England Amateurs
England Amateurs score listed first, score column indicates score after each Moore goal.

References

External links 
 William Moore at westhamstats.info

1894 births
1968 deaths
Footballers from Newcastle upon Tyne
English footballers
England amateur international footballers
England international footballers
Association football inside forwards
Seaton Delaval F.C. players
Sunderland A.F.C. players
West Ham United F.C. players
English Football League players
West Ham United F.C. non-playing staff
FA Cup Final players
Association football coaches